Bon Aqua may refer to:

Bon Aqua, Tennessee
Bon Aqua Junction, Tennessee
BonAqua, a Coca-Cola Company brand